Catholic Health Initiatives (CHI) St. Alexius Health Bismarck is a regional, acute care medical center offering inpatient and outpatient medical services, including primary and specialty physician clinics, home health and hospice services, medical equipment services, and a fitness and human performance center. It is a level II trauma center. With a tertiary hospital in Bismarck, the system also consists of critical access hospitals (CAHs) in Carrington, ND, Dickinson, ND, Devils Lake, ND, Garrison, ND, Turtle Lake, ND, Washburn, ND and Williston, ND, and numerous clinics and outpatient services. CHI St. Alexius Health manages four CAHs in North Dakota - Elgin, ND, Linton, ND and Wishek, ND, as well as Mobridge Regional Medical Center in Mobridge, South Dakota.

History
Since its founding in 1885, CHI St. Alexius Health Bismarck has served the residents of central and western North Dakota, northern South Dakota, and eastern Montana. CHI St. Alexius Health is a Roman Catholic organization whose parent organization is Catholic Health Initiatives. In 2018 Dignity Health and Catholic Health Initiatives (CHI) received approval from the Catholic Church through the Vatican to merge. When completed the new hospital network, called CommonSpirit Health, will be the largest non-profit hospital system in the United States based on revenue.

Ownership
CHI St. Alexius Health is part of CommonSpirit Health, a nonprofit, Catholic health system. It was created in February 2019 through the alignment of Catholic Health Initiatives and Dignity Health. With its national office in Chicago and a team of approximately 150,000 employees and 25,000 physicians and advanced practice clinicians, CommonSpirit Health operates 142 hospitals and more than 700 care sites across 21 states. In FY 2018, Catholic Health Initiatives and Dignity Health had combined revenues of $29.2 billion and provided $4.2 billion in charity care, community benefit, and un-reimbursed government programs.

Sponsors for CHI St. Alexius Health are the Sisters of St. Benedict of the Annunciation Monastery, Bismarck, ND and as an organization it follows the Ethical and Religious Directives for Catholic Health Care Services as promulgated by the United States Conference of Catholic Bishops.

CHI medical facilities
The hospitals, clinics and medical plazas that are part of CHI include the following facilities in North Dakota:

References

External links 

Buildings and structures in Bismarck, North Dakota
Catholic hospitals
Hospitals established in 1885
Hospitals in North Dakota
Trauma centers